John Williams's Concerto for Horn and Orchestra is a solo composition for horn with orchestra accompaniment.  Williams wrote the piece for principal horn player Dale Clevenger of the Chicago Symphony Orchestra in 2003 on a commission from the Edward F. Schmidt Family Commissioning Fund.  The premiere performance took place on November 29, 2003.  The work is technically demanding of the performer, and Williams himself described it as a symphonic poem that explores a variety of colors and moods.

Unlike most instrumental concerti, this particular work is written in five movements.

Angelus: Far far away, like bells ... At evening pealing
The Battle of the Trees: Swift Oak ... Stout Guardian of the Door
Pastorale: There Came a Day at Summer's Full
The Hunt: The Hart Loves the Highwood
Nocturne: The Crimson Day Withdraws

Williams selected the quotes associated with each of the five movements from the works of various writers whom he admires.

Instrumentation 
This concerto is scored for a large orchestra, consisting of 3 flutes and piccolo, 3 oboes and English horn, 3 clarinets and bass clarinet, 3 bassoons and contrabassoon, 4 horns, 3 trumpets, 3 trombones, tuba, timpani, percussion, piano, celesta, harp and strings.

References

External links 
 John Williams Fan Network
 Interview with Dale Clevenger by Bruce Duffie, October 16, 2003

Compositions by John Williams
2003 compositions
Williams
Music commissioned by the Chicago Symphony Orchestra